Chan Hao-ching (born September 19, 1993), also known as Angel Chan, is a Taiwanese professional tennis player. She is primarily a doubles specialist, having won 19 WTA Tour, two WTA Challenger and six ITF titles in that discipline. Chan reached the final of the mixed-doubles competition at Wimbledon with Max Mirnyi in 2014, her first major final. She reached two more finals in 2017, the Wimbledon women's doubles with Monica Niculescu, and the US Open mixed doubles with Michael Venus. She is the younger sister of fellow professional tennis player and former world No. 1 in women's doubles, Latisha Chan, formerly known as Chan Yung-jan.

Tennis career

2013
At the beginning of the season, Chan won the Shenzhen Open with her sister Chan Yung-jan, beating Irina Buryachok and Valeria Solovieva in straight sets. She reached the quarterfinals of the Indian Wells Open with Janette Husárová, falling to Ekaterina Makarova and Elena Vesnina. At the Portugal Open, she won her second title of the year with Kristina Mladenovic, defeating Darija Jurak and Katalin Marosi in straight sets. Chan reached the second round of the French Open with Darija Jurak. She then suffered first round losses at both Wimbledon and the US Open, and also reached the finals of the Southern California Open with Janette Husárová and the Pan Pacific Open with Liezel Huber. She finished 2013 ranked 26th.

2014
At Wimbledon, Chan reached the finals of the mixed-doubles draw with Max Mirnyi to reach her first Grand Slam final. Along the way, they defeated the defending champions Daniel Nestor and Kristina Mladenovic in straight sets. However, the pair lost the final to Nenad Zimonjić and Samantha Stosur, also in straight sets.

2015: First Premier-5 title and Major quarterfinal 
Early in the year, Chan won the title at the Thailand Open with her sister, defeating Shuko Aoyama and Tamarine Tanasugarn in three sets. 

They won their fourth WTA doubles title together at the Western & Southern Open, and by doing so, had the second largest number of WTA Tour doubles titles for a pair of sisters in WTA history following only Serena and Venus Williams. Cincinnati represented their biggest title yet and their first at the Premier-5 level. Next, they won another title at the Japan Women's Open in Tokyo.

The Chans reached two other finals, at the Pan Pacific Open, losing to Garbiñe Muguruza and Carla Suárez Navarro, and the China Open, losing to the No. 1 pairing of Martina Hingis and Sania Mirza. Hao-Ching and Yung-Jan became the third all-sister pairing to qualify for the WTA Finals after Manuela Maleeva and Katerina Maleeva in 1986 and the Williams sisters in 2009. They reached the semifinals, losing again to Hingis and Mirza. It was Chan's first appearance at the tournament. She finished 2015 ranked 12th, her best year-end ranking so far.

2016: Two major quarterfinals, top 5 debut

2017: Wimbledon finalist
The Chan sisters ended their doubles partnership early in 2017, with Yung-jan teaming up with Martina Hingis, while Hao-ching had a variety of teammates. Hao-ching became only the second Taiwanese woman, following 2013 champion Hsieh Su-wei, to reach the Wimbledon women's doubles final. Playing with Monica Niculescu, who was also making her first appearance in a Grand Slam final, they were overwhelmed 6–0, 6–0 by the pair of Makarova and Vesnina. It was only the second such result in a final in the history of the competition.

During the tournament at Cincinnati, she had arranged to play in the mixed doubles at the US Open with New Zealander Michael Venus. With both having current individual rankings of 12, they were the third seeds for the tournament. Although they knew about each other, they didn't actually meet for the first time until they were walking to the court for their first match together. After four wins on their "lucky" court 17, they were through to the final against top seeds Martina Hingis and Jamie Murray. Outclassed in the first set, losing 1–6 in just 22 minutes, they fought back to win the second set 6–4, setting up a match tiebreaker. With a couple of minibreaks from both teams, it was tied up at 8–8 before Hingis and Murray finally took the match and the title, remaining unbeaten as a pair after teaming up for the first time at Wimbledon two months earlier.

2018: French Open SF

2020: Australian Open SF

2023: Fourth Australian Open QF 
Chan reached the quarterfinals for the fourth time at the Australian Open, partnering Yang Zhaoxuan.

She won her 19th WTA Tour title at the Thailand Open, partnering with Wu Fang-hsien.

Equipment
The Chan sisters use Wilson racquets. They are also sponsored by Taiwan Mobile, EVA Air, and French apparel company Lacoste.

Performance timeline

''Only main-draw results in WTA Tour, Grand Slam tournaments, Fed Cup/Billie Jean King Cup and Olympic Games are included in win–loss records.

Doubles

Mixed doubles

Significant finals

Grand Slam tournaments

Women's doubles: 1 (runner-up)

Mixed doubles: 3 (runner-ups)

WTA 1000 tournaments

Doubles: 5 (2 titles, 3 runner-ups)

WTA career finals

Doubles: 35 (19 titles, 16 runner-ups)

WTA Challenger finals

Doubles: 2 (2 titles)

ITF Circuit finals

Doubles: 9 (6 titles, 3 runner–ups)

Notes

References

External links

 
 
 
 Chan Hao-ching profile on Sportsway

Living people
1993 births
Taiwanese people of Hakka descent
Hakka sportspeople
Taiwanese female tennis players
Sportspeople from Taichung
Asian Games medalists in tennis
Tennis players at the 2014 Asian Games
Tennis players at the 2018 Asian Games
Asian Games gold medalists for Chinese Taipei
Asian Games silver medalists for Chinese Taipei
Asian Games bronze medalists for Chinese Taipei
Tennis players at the 2016 Summer Olympics
Olympic tennis players of Taiwan
Medalists at the 2014 Asian Games
Universiade medalists in tennis
Medalists at the 2018 Asian Games
Universiade gold medalists for Chinese Taipei
Medalists at the 2017 Summer Universiade
Tennis players at the 2020 Summer Olympics